Galls Creek is a stream in the U.S. state of Oregon. It is a tributary to the Rogue River.

Galls Creek was named in the 1850s after one Jacob Gall.

References

Rivers of Oregon
Rivers of Jackson County, Oregon